|}

The Zetland Gold Cup is a flat Handicap horse race in Great Britain open to horses aged three-year-old and up. It is run at Redcar over a distance of 1 mile 2 furlongs and 1 yard (2,013 metres), and it is scheduled to take place each year at the end of May or beginning of June.

Winners since 1988

See also
 Horse racing in Great Britain
 List of British flat horse races

References

 Paris-Turf: 
, 
Racing Post

Open middle distance horse races
Flat races in Great Britain
Redcar Racecourse